East Riding Senior Cup is the foremost football cup competition for teams affiliated to the East Riding County Football Association.

Recent Finals

2022-23 Current Participating Teams

References

East Riding Senior Cup finals at FCHD Football Club History Database

East Riding of Yorkshire